Paul Elliott  (born April 1954) has been professor of epidemiology and public health medicine at Imperial College London since 1995. He is director of REACT (Real-time Assessment of Community Transmission), a community coronavirus testing programme. He is also director of the National Institute for Health Research (NIHR) Health Protection Research Unit for Chemical and Radiation Threats & Hazards.

Elliott was appointed Commander of the Order of the British Empire (CBE) in the 2021 Birthday Honours for services to scientific research in public health.

References

External links 
Paul Elliott, Imperial

Living people
1954 births
Academics of Imperial College London
British epidemiologists
Fellows of the Royal College of Physicians
Fellows of the Academy of Medical Sciences (United Kingdom)
Commanders of the Order of the British Empire
NIHR Senior Investigators